The 2022 U.S. Men's Clay Court Championships (also known as the Fayez Sarofim & Co. U.S. Men's Clay Court Championships for sponsorship purposes) was a tennis tournament played on outdoor clay courts.

It was the 52nd edition of the U.S. Men's Clay Court Championships, and an ATP Tour 250 event on the 2022 ATP Tour. It was originally scheduled to take place at River Oaks Country Club in Houston, Texas, United States for April 6 through April 12, 2020, but this edition of the tournament was postponed to April 4 through April 10, 2022 due to the COVID-19 pandemic.

Champions

Singles 

  Reilly Opelka def.  John Isner, 6–3, 7–6(9–7)

Doubles 

  Matthew Ebden /  Max Purcell def.  Ivan Sabanov /  Matej Sabanov, 6–3, 6–3

Point and prize money

Point

Prize money 

*per team

Singles main draw entrants

Seeds

Rankings are as of March 21, 2022.

Other entrants
The following players received wildcards into the main draw:
  Nick Kyrgios
  Jack Sock
  J. J. Wolf

The following players received entry via the qualifying draw:
  Gijs Brouwer
  Christian Harrison
  Mitchell Krueger
  Max Purcell

The following players received entry as a lucky loser:
  Steven Diez
  Michael Mmoh

Withdrawals
Before the tournament
  Kevin Anderson → replaced by  Daniel Elahi Galán
  Francisco Cerúndolo → replaced by  Juan Pablo Varillas
  Lloyd Harris → replaced by  Sam Querrey
  Adrian Mannarino → replaced by  Steve Johnson
  Jaume Munar → replaced by  Steven Diez
  Casper Ruud → replaced by  Michael Mmoh
  Kwon Soon-woo → replaced by  Denis Kudla

Doubles main draw entrants

Seeds 

1 Rankings as of March 21, 2022.

Other entrants 
The following pairs received a wildcard into the doubles main draw:
  William Blumberg /  Max Schnur
  Nick Kyrgios /  Jack Sock

Withdrawals 
 Before the tournament
  Nicholas Monroe /  Frances Tiafoe → replaced by  Nicholas Monroe /  Fernando Romboli
  Marcos Giron /  Hunter Reese → replaced by  Pablo Cuevas /  Hunter Reese

References

External links

Official website

2022
2022 in American tennis
April 2022 sports events in the United States
Tennis events postponed due to the COVID-19 pandemic
2022 ATP Tour